Orthetrum monardi is a species of dragonfly in the family Libellulidae. It is found in Angola, Benin, Burkina Faso, Cameroon, Central African Republic, the Republic of the Congo, Ivory Coast, Ethiopia, Gambia, Ghana, Guinea, Guinea-Bissau, Kenya, Nigeria, Sierra Leone, Tanzania, Uganda, and Zambia. Its natural habitat is subtropical or tropical swamps.

References

Libellulidae
Taxonomy articles created by Polbot
Insects described in 1951